The Lonely Crossing and Other Poems (1905) is a collection of poems by Australian poet Louisa Lawson. It was the only collection of her work published during her lifetime.

The collection includes 52 poems by the author that are reprinted from various sources, although most appeared first in The Dawn, an early Australian feminist magazine that Lawson also edited.

Contents

Critical reception
On its original publication The Freeman's Journal stated that "The literary level reached in these fugitive products of a life which has been too strenuous for dalliance with the Muses may not reach the highest level of poesy ; but they have the true sweet note of the simple lyric and are faithful to nature whether of the observative or contemplative order. More than that, they are an earnest that the authoress might worthily vest herself, if she would, in the singing robes of Australia."

In a minor review The Maitland Weekly Mercury noted "Her life has been one of hard work, and of many struggles against adverse circumstances, but these experiences have probably only the better fitted her to write many sweet and helpful sonnets for the encouragement of her countrywomen."

See also
 The full text of the collection is available from the University of Sydney
 1905 in Australian literature
 1905 in poetry

References

Australian poetry collections
1905 books